The EOS-1D Mark IV is a professional 16.1 effective megapixels digital single lens reflex camera (DSLR) camera body produced by Canon. The EOS-1D Mark IV is the successor of the Canon EOS-1D Mark III and was announced on 20 October 2009, just four days after Nikon announced the D3s. It used to be the only Canon APS-H format DSLR to feature HD video recording at 1080p resolution.

It was discontinued in mid-2012 with the introduction of the Canon EOS-1D X, which replaced both the EOS-1D Mk IV and the EOS-1Ds Mk III.

It received a Gold Award from Digital Photography Review.

Features
 27.9mm × 18.6mm; 16.1 effective megapixels APS-H CMOS sensor
 Dual DIGIC 4 image processors
 Canon EF lens mount (excludes EF-S)
 New autofocus module (45 AF points with 39 cross-type AF points)
 Integrated sensor cleaning system
 1.3× crop factor
 100–12800 ISO speed equivalent (expandable to L: 50, H1: 25600, H2: 51200 or H3: 102400)
 30–1/8000 sec. shutter speed and bulb
 Shutter unit tested to 300,000 cycles
 Auto Lighting Optimizer
 Magnesium Alloy weather sealed body
 Eye-level pentaprism viewfinder with approx. 100% coverage at 0.76× magnification
 Live preview mode
 3.0 in, 920,000 dots Clear View II TFT color, liquid-crystal monitor with 160° viewing angle
 10 frames per second continuous shooting (Large JPEG: max. 121 frames, raw: max. 28 frames)
 Dimensions (W×H×D): 156 × 156.6 × 89.9 mm

See also
Canon EF lens mount

References

External links
 
 Canon EOS-1D Mark IV Product Page at Canon USA
 Canon EOS-1D Mark IV White Paper at Canon USA
 Canon EOS-1D Mark IV Press Release at Canon Europe

1D Mark IV
Live-preview digital cameras
Cameras introduced in 2009